İnanç Koç (born February 9, 1979) is a Turkish professional basketball coach and former player. He played the small forward position. He was most recently the assistant coach for the Yukatel Merkezefendi of the Turkish Basketball Super League.

References

External links
TBLStat.net Profile

1979 births
Living people
Bandırma B.İ.K. players
Beşiktaş men's basketball players
Karşıyaka basketball players
Mersin Büyükşehir Belediyesi S.K. players
Small forwards
Tofaş S.K. players
Turkish men's basketball players
Yeşilgiresun Belediye players